Mikea National Park is a proposed national park in the Mikea Forest region of southwestern Madagascar, between Manombo and Morombe. It stretches over 120km from North to South between the Mangoky River and the Manombo river. It is situated west along the coast of National Road 9.

See also
Mikea Forest

References

National parks of Madagascar
Atsimo-Andrefana
Madagascar spiny thickets